Actinium(III) chloride is a chemical compound containing the rare radioactive element actinium. This salt has the formula AcCl3. Molecular weight of the compound is 333.378 g/mol.

Synthesis
Actinium(III) chloride is made by reacting actinium hydroxide with carbon tetrachloride.
4 Ac(OH)3 + 3 CCl4 → 4AcCl3 + 3CO2 + 6H2O

References

Actinium compounds
Chlorides
Actinide halides